Kowloon Public Pier or Tsim Sha Tsui Public Pier is a public pier in Tsim Sha Tsui, Kowloon, Hong Kong. It approaches Hong Kong Cultural Centre and Victoria Harbour. Any boat can freely park at the pier.

It is south of the Clock Tower and south-west of the Hong Kong Cultural Centre. The Tsim Sha Tsui Ferry Pier is north-west of it.

History 
Kowloon Public Pier was a public pier outside Tsim Sha Tsui KCR station. Before the Cross-Harbour Tunnel and Star Ferry were in use, residents on Hong Kong Island took walla-wallas to the pier and interchanged to take the train at Tsim Sha Tsui KCR station to travel to New Territories and Mainland China.

Olympic Torch Relay 
Kowloon Public Pier was one of the stops of Olympic torch relay activities in Hong Kong during 1964 Tokyo Olympics and 2008 Beijing Olympics.

References

Piers in Hong Kong
Tsim Sha Tsui
Victoria Harbour